Ali Awana (born 3 November 1997) is an Emirati footballer who plays as a midfielder, most recently for Baniyas.

Career
Awana started his career at Baniyas. is constantly playing with the Baniyas U21, On 27 February 2019, Awana made his professional debut for Baniyas against Al-Wahda in the Pro League, replacing Suhail Al-Noubi .

Career statistics

Club

Notes

References

External links 
 

1997 births
Living people
Emirati footballers
Association football midfielders
Baniyas Club players
UAE Pro League players